Summerside may refer to:

Culture
 Summer Side of Life

Geographic locations

Canada
 Summerside, Edmonton, a neighbourhood in Edmonton, Alberta
 Irishtown-Summerside, a town in Newfoundland and Labrador
 Summerside, Prince Edward Island

United States
 Summerside, Ohio

Military
 CFB Summerside
  (I), a Royal Canadian Navy vessel that served during the Battle of the Atlantic
  (II), a Canadian Forces vessel commissioned in 1999

Sport
 Summerside Storm
 Summerside Western Capitals

Transport
 Summerside Airport

See also
 Springside (disambiguation)